Hymenothrix wrightii (Wright's hymenothrix or Wright's thimblehead) is a North American species of flowering plant in the daisy family. It grows in northwestern Mexico (Sonora, Chihuahua, Baja California) and the southwestern United States (western Texas, Arizona, New Mexico, far southern California).

Hymenothrix wrightii is a perennial herb up to 60 cm (2 feet) tall. One plant produces 6-8 flower heads per stem, in a flat-topped array. Each head has 15-30 white, pink, or pale purple disc flowers but no ray flowers. The individual disc flowers are larger and showier than in many other species in the family.

References

Bahieae
Flora of Northwestern Mexico
Flora of the Southwestern United States
Flora of California
Natural history of the Peninsular Ranges
Plants described in 1853
Taxa named by Asa Gray
Flora without expected TNC conservation status